The Greeley House is a historic First Period house on New Hampshire Route 108, east of the center of East Kingston, New Hampshire. Built about 1718, it is one of the community's oldest surviving buildings, and a distinctive and visible reminder of its largely agrarian past. The house was listed on the National Register of Historic Places in 1980.

Description and history
The Greeley House is located on the north side of New Hampshire Route 108, just a few feet from the roadway, at a point where it bends, mainly to avoid the house. It is a 2½-story wood-frame structure, with a gabled roof, central chimney, and clapboarded exterior. Its main facade is five bays wide on the first floor and three on the second. The entrance is at the center, framed by a modest surround with a peaked lintel. The rear roof line extends to the first floor, giving the house a saltbox profile, and there is a shed-roof addition on the east side which was added in the 1960s. A gabled dormer projects from the rear roof face.

The house is believed to have been built in 1718 by Joseph Greeley. Its prominent location along the major east–west route through the town (between Kingston and Seabrook) has made it a landmark in the town for many years.

See also
National Register of Historic Places listings in Rockingham County, New Hampshire

References

Houses on the National Register of Historic Places in New Hampshire
Georgian architecture in New Hampshire
Houses completed in 1718
Houses in Rockingham County, New Hampshire
National Register of Historic Places in Rockingham County, New Hampshire
East Kingston, New Hampshire
1718 establishments in the Thirteen Colonies